Mao Peiqi (Chinese: 毛佩琦; Pinyin: Máo Pèiqí) is a Chinese historian, expert in the history of the Ming Dynasty, a professor at the School of History, Renmin University of China.

Mao became popular in China for his lectures on Ming's history in the CCTV-10 program Lecture Room in 2005. Based upon his CCTV lecture, Mao published a book, The Seventeen Emperors of the Ming Dynasty (毛佩琦细解明朝十七帝 ) in 2006.

External links
 Profile of Mao Peiqi (in Chinese)

Academic staff of Renmin University of China
People's Republic of China historians
Historians of China
Year of birth missing (living people)
Living people